Choose Your Own Adventure: The Abominable Snowman is a 2006 animated interactive DVD movie based on the Choose Your Own Adventure gamebook of the same name by R. A. Montgomery. Viewers make choices every 3–6 minutes using their DVD player remote control to determine what happens. It was released on DVD on July 25, 2006.

Plot
The North siblings, Benjamin, Crista and Marco, must rescue their missing Uncle Rudy, who has gone to the Himalayas in search of the mythical Yeti. The first decision that the player has to make is when their Fokker F27 has a fuel leak and they either have to parachute or stay.

Producer Jeff Norton explains that they aspired to create alternate story paths (there are "over eleven possible endings") with different characters and story developments and yet obey the rules of their fictional world.

Cast
William H. Macy as Rudyard North
Frankie Muniz as Benjamin North
Lacey Chabert as Crista North
Daryl Sabara as Marco North
Felicity Huffman as Pilot Neema
Mark Hamill as Jamling
Phil LaMarr as Pasang
Dee Bradley Baker as Bucky
James Hong as Monk
Kim Mai Guest as Old Woman

Production
Jeff Norton and Michelle Crames (the producers of the film and founders of Lean Forward Media) recall reading the classic Choose Your Own Adventure series in their youths. Norton explains that they "developed a patent-pending technology" for using the remote control and created the film's main characters (forgoing the book's more ambiguous second-person perspective). He noted the touch of cinematic perspective Bob Doucette brought the film. Director Norton believed that the interactivity would provide an interesting way for parents and children to discuss the story and characters. The DVD also provides documentary material on life in Nepal, cast interviews, and a music video.

Norton stated on Leanforwardmedia.com that the film would appeal to parents who grew up with the books. Crame said that parents would value the film because through it kids would learn about making decisions and the consequences of those decisions.

Upon its release the film was featured on “18 million boxes of Life cereal.”

Reception
In their review, the Dove Foundation praised the concept of the film, stating that, “Teaching your children how to make choices, and deal with what the outcomes of those choices might be, is hard to do,” and noting that each adventure can last 20 minutes depending on the choices the viewer makes. Kidzworld gave it four stars and noted how the DVD makes a choice for the viewer after a certain amount of time. Dave Johnson, in a  review on DVD Verdict, praised the overall concept of “multiple branching storylines” on a DVD and noted the colorful animation, anamorphic widescreen presentation and 5.1 surround sound.

Colin Jacobson in a review for DVD Movie Guide said that the color palette was a strength but found many aspects of the film to be generic and uninteresting; he also stated that the smoothness with which the story transitions is sometimes an issue and found one life-decision choice to be unfairly punishing.

Series
Choose Your Own Adventure: The Abominable Snowman was to be the first in a series of DVDs based on the Choose Your Own Adventure books. Other planned releases included The Lost Jewels and Mystery of the Maya. As of early 2018, however, there have yet to be further releases.

Music video
The song in the music video, called "Choose Your Own Adventure", was composed and written by Arnie Roman and Russ DeSalvo, while the vocals were provided by Cassidy Ladden. It can be found on YouTube.

Endorsements
Approved for Family Viewing by Dove Foundation
2006 iParenting Media Award Winner
Kids First! All Star Award
Film Advisory Board Seal of Approval

References

External links

ChooseCo web site

2006 direct-to-video films
2006 films
2006 video games
American children's animated films
American direct-to-video films
Choose Your Own Adventure
Direct-to-video animated films
DVD interactive technology
Interactive films
Video games developed in the United States
2000s children's animated films
2000s American films